The Matt Leyden Trophy is awarded annually to the Ontario Hockey League Coach of the Year. The award is chosen by fellow OHL general managers. Teams were not permitted to vote for a coach from their own hockey club. Coaches receive five points for a first place vote, three points for a second place vote and one point for a third place vote. Winners of the award are also nominated for the Brian Kilrea Coach of the Year Award for the Canadian Hockey League.

It is named in honour of Matt Leyden, a former president of the Ontario Hockey Association, and long-time general manager of the Oshawa Generals. Leyden established the Generals dynasty that won seven consecutive J. Ross Robertson Cups and three Memorial Cups between 1937 and 1944.

Winners
List of winners of the Matt Leyden Trophy.
 Blue background denotes also named Brian Kilrea Coach of the Year Award

See also
 Ron Lapointe Trophy – Quebec Major Junior Hockey League Coach of the Year
 Dunc McCallum Memorial Trophy – Western Hockey League Coach of the Year
 List of Canadian Hockey League awards

References

External links
 Ontario Hockey League

Ontario Hockey League trophies and awards
Canada 2
Awards established in 1972